Gunnar Jonas Sima (born 31 May 1937 in Hudiksvall, Sweden) is a Swedish filmmaker, journalist, writer and educator.

Biography

Though born in Hudiksvall, Sima grew up in Ljusdal in Gävleborg County. He has continuously served as secretary of the Hälsingland Academy since that cultural group was founded in 1988.

In the autumn of 2006 he stood for election to Parliament on the Social Democratic list in Stockholm, but with the party's popular vote declining to 35 percent, he was not one of the 130 MPs the party elected, and a centre-right coalition government led by the Moderate Party took office.

In recent years he has held positions on the board of the Stockholm City Theatre (1998-2006) and served as secretary of the Kulturarbetarnas socialdemokratiska förening ("Cultural Workers Social Democratic Union", known by its Swedish initials KSF), a left-leaning community of artistic workers centred on Stockholm.

Sima is married to Inger Edvardsson, an executive with the Swedish Film Institute; they have two adult daughters.

Writing- and film-related activities
Sima was connected with the Swedish tabloid newspaper Expressen as a film critic for 11 years, followed by 22 years as a reporter. During the last two years before leaving the paper in 2000 he chronicled personal interviews for the tabloid's back page. He currently works as a freelance reviewer of movies and books, as well as a journalist and lecturer for the Arbetarnas bildningsförbund ("Workers Educational Association", known as ABF). He writes for movie magazines, political magazines and other publications, and regularly contributes columns for smaller Hälsingland newspapers, including Hudiksvalls Tidning, Ljusdals-Posten, Ljusnan and Söderhamns Kuriren.

Jonas Sima has coauthored more than 20 books, including the internationally acclaimed interview book Bergman on Bergman (1970, English translation 1993). He is one of the contributors to Murvelminnen: 46 journaliter berättar ("Reporting memories: 46 journalists' accounts", 2012) and has written three children's books about his Blåsjöbarna characters ("Blue Lake children", 1974–77).

He served as editor of three anthologies on the Hälsingland region, in one book writing about the influence of Nazi ideology in his homeland. Another work, Kalas-Praktika (2009), describes how to prepare sculpin soup. Another anthology, Citizen Schein (2010), has the theme of mastery of conflict and is devoted to Harry Schein (1924-2006), a writer and film critic for Dagens Nyheter who was instrumental in placing the Swedish film industry on a sound financial footing.

Jonas Sima has produced some 60 documentary films and two feature films, most shown on Swedish television. Recent productions include Filmaren i Storskogen (2009); Inget jävla joll! (2010); and Lisbet (2011), a conversation with Lisbet Palme, widow of assassinated Swedish Prime Minister Olof Palme and now a spokesperson for UNICEF and a member of the OAU team which investigated the Rwandan genocide of 1994.

Filmography
 2011: Lisbet
 2004: Storsamlaren på Hillsta
 2003: Solo
 2002: Kalle Kamrat
 1996: Vildhussen
 1993: Dragspelskungen
 1991: Putte à la clarinette and Putte på Stampen
 1990: Ljuset i dalen
 1988: De sista skidåkarna
 1984: På tur med Tor
 1983: Åke Hasselgård Story and Pipmäster
 1980: Barna från Blåsjöfjället
 1976: Hej Amerika, lyssna!
 1974: Drömmål
 1973: Cosmic Love and Döden tänkte jag mig inte så
 1972: Oh, mein Poppe! and Revolutionen i Sveg
 1971: Älgjakten and En filmförfattare
 1970: Röde skräddarn and Välkommen till Grekland
 1969: Matchen
 1968: Porträtt av Per and Tage
 1967: Kajsa
 1965: Den våta stenen
 1962: Dragarbrunn

Notes

External links
 Sveriges Släktforskarförbund (Federation of Swedish Genealogical Societies)

People from Ljusdal Municipality
Swedish film directors
Swedish journalists
Swedish male writers
1937 births
Living people
Swedish children's writers